Éxitos Eternos the eighth compilation album by Mexican pop singer Mijares. It was released in 2004.

Track listing
Source:[]
 No Hace Falta Que lo Digas
 Bella
 María Bonita
 Que Nada Nos Separe
 Bonita
 No Se Murió el Amor
 Para Amarnos más
 El Privilegio de Amar
 Estrella Mia
 Te Extraño
 Aunque No Estés
 Si Me Enamoro
 La Belleza
 Dame Una Flor (Buy Me a Rose)
 Estrella Mia (Multimedia Track)

Credits
 Carolina Arenas → Production Coordination
 Valério Do Carmo → Art Direction, Illustrations
 Luis Gómez Escolar → Translation
 Judy Figueroa → Graphic Design
 Bruce McIntosh → Compilation, Concept
 Randy Suarez → Critic, Project Coordinator

References

2004 greatest hits albums
Manuel Mijares compilation albums
Universal Music Mexico albums